Suffolk county cricket teams were the cricket teams that represented the historic county of Suffolk before the first official formation of Suffolk County Cricket Club in 1864.

The earliest known reference to cricket in Suffolk is from 1743 and the first mention of a Suffolk representative team is in 1764, with Suffolk playing against Norfolk at Bury St Edmunds racecourse on 23 August. Norfolk won this match, which was reported in the Gazetteer & London Daily Advertiser on Tuesday 28 August. Suffolk played two further matches against Norfolk on 10 and 12 September at Scole, Norfolk.

A team representative of Suffolk is next recorded as playing in 1827 against the Marylebone Cricket Club (MCC). It was during this time that the Bury St Edmunds club became prominent, its reputation enhanced when Fuller Pilch joined in 1824. It was the Bury Club, as it was often called,<ref>ACS, Important Matches, pp. 14–15.</ref> playing under the name of Suffolk, that played two first-class matches against MCC in 1830, one at Lord's and the other at Field Lane, Bury St Edmunds. In 1847 Suffolk played two more first-class matches against MCC at the same venues.

Teams representative of Suffolk continued to play minor matches until at least 1859, when an All-England Eleven played the county. The original Suffolk County Cricket Club was formed on 27 July 1864. It was reconstituted in 1932 and has always been a minor county team.

PlayersSee :Category:Suffolk cricketers''

References

Bibliography
 
 
 

History of Suffolk
English cricket teams in the 18th century
English cricket in the 19th century
Former senior cricket clubs
Cricket in Suffolk